Ocydina is a monotypic snout moth genus described by Edward Meyrick in 1936. Its single species, Ocydina syngrammaula, described by the same author in the same year, is found in Congo.

References

Pyralidae genera
Pyralinae
Monotypic moth genera
Moths of Africa
Taxa named by Edward Meyrick